Ceratarges was a genus of lichid Trilobite from the Middle Devonian. It lived in what is now western Europe and Morocco.

References

Lichida
Middle Devonian first appearances
Late Devonian animals
Late Devonian genus extinctions
Devonian trilobites of Africa
Fossil taxa described in 1901
Paleozoic life of the Northwest Territories